Rev. Dr. Andrea Zaki Stephanous (  ; born June 30, 1960) is president of the Protestant Community of Egypt, and General Director of the Coptic Evangelical Organization for Social Services.

Early life and education
Zaki was born in 1960. After receiving his B. of Theology from Cairo Evangelical Seminary, Cairo, Egypt in 1983, he went to Coady International Institute, St. Francis Xavier University, Antigonish, Nova Scotia, Canada, where he continued his studies, receiving a Diploma in Social Development in 1988.

In 1994, he received Master of Arts in theological studies (major social change), Eastern University, Pennsylvania, US, and in 2003 he received his Ph.D. in religions and theology, University of Manchester, Manchester, UK.

Employment experience

Current positions 
 General Director of the Coptic Evangelical Organization for Social Services.
 President of the Protestant Community of Egypt (2015–present)
 President of the Fellowship of Middle East Evangelical Churches
 Director, Dar El Thaqafa Communications House, CEOSS
 Editor Manager – Agnihat El Nessour (Eagle's wings), a magazine published by CEOSS expressing the point of view of Egyptian Christians ( 1994 – present ).
 Part-time Lecturer giving a course on Political Religions and Theological Foundation for  Social Change  at the Evangelical Theological Seminary in Cairo (ETSC).

Previous positions 
 Vice General Director for Program Affairs in CEOSS
 Moderator, Synod of the Nile of the Presbyterian churches of Egypt (2006).
 Chairman of Council of Services & Development, Synod of the Nile of the Presbyterian churches of Egypt (2000–2008).
 Chairman of Cairo Presbytery, Synod of the Nile of the Presbyterian Church of Egypt ( 2002–2003 ).
 Secretary of Projects, Council of Services & Development, Synod of the Nile of the Evangelical Church of Egypt ( 1994–2000).
 Head of CEOSS" Forum of Intercultural Dialogue  - dealing with political and economic issues facing Egypt today, engaging leaders, government officials and intellectuals, both Muslim & Christian in direct dialogue (1994–1999 ).
 Director of CEOSS' Development Sector  in North Egypt ( 1991–1994 ).
 Chairman of CEOSS' Curriculum Committee ( 1991–1994 ).
 Head of CEOSS' Training Unit - responsible for staff training and scholarships ( 1993–1994).
 Editor of CEOSS' Development Magazine Risalet El Nour (Message of Light) (1992–1994).
 Member of Dar El Thaqafa Council   ( 1990–1994 ).
 Associate Director for CEOSS' Development Sector ( 1988–1991 ).
 Head of CEOSS' Cairo Development Sector ( 1987–1988 ).
 Community Coordinator of CEOSS' Development Sector ( 1986 ).

Publications

Publications in Arabic 
Author of two books entitled:
Copts and the Revolution. Dar El Thaqafa Communications House, 2014
 Jesus and Historical Criticism: The Story of the Conflict Between Salvation and Social Change. Cairo: Dar El Thaqafa Communications House, 1996.
 Political Islam, Citizenship and Minorities: The Future of Arab Christians in the Middle East. Cairo: Sherouk International Library, 2006.

Writer of 40 articles in Arabic published in national newspapers like Al-Ahram newspaper and in Christian Magazines

Publications in English 
 Author of the book entitled " Political Islam, Citizenship, and Minorities" published by University Press of America.
 Writer of 7 articles in English for Action- WACC, IVP Academic and World Vision.

Personal Information 
Zaki is married with three children.

References 

1960 births
Coptic Christians from Egypt
Egyptian evangelicals
Egyptian religious leaders
Living people